Hymenocallis franklinensis  (Franklin spiderlily) is a bulb-forming herb in the family Amaryllidaceae. It is endemic to the lower Ochlockonee River system of the Florida panhandle. It is similar to H. crassifolia Herb. but with larger flowers and broader scape bases.

References

franklinensis
Endemic flora of Florida
Plants described in 2001
Flora without expected TNC conservation status